"You're All I Have" is a song by Northern Irish alternative rock band Snow Patrol. It was released on 24 April 2006 as the lead single from their fourth studio album, Eyes Open (2006). The song was used by RTÉ sport to promote the return of The Sunday Game for the 2006 GAA Championships. It became the band's second big hit after the success of "Run" in 2004, peaking at number seven on the UK Singles Chart.

Background
According to Snow Patrol frontman Gary Lightbody: "It's near the beginning of a dangerously reliant relationship. The album is full of songs like this. Rather than a break-up record this is a make-up record. That is a massive generalisation but it is a more positive record than the last". He has said that "the song is about a damaging but fulfilling relationship, something that terrifies you, but you can't quite bring yourself to look away".

Reception

Critical reception
Yahoo! Music's Ben Gilbert welcomed the single warmly, giving it 7 stars out of 10. He said that the song was Snow Patrol's return to the UK rock scene "with the sort of form that would see an ex-con arrested on sight." Though he criticised the song for being "too much of a mediocre stretch bearing in mind our location in the year 2006 and the current existence of Spank Rock", he defended the song saying "there is a keening momentum and inevitably busted emotional power to Gary Lightbody and co's comeback that suggest all of their dreams are about to come true."

Accolades

Music video
The music video for the song was directed by Nathan Connolly. It was filmed in a working power station in Kent. It features the band play the song on a platform 120 feet in the air. When the single was released in the United States, another video directed by David S. Goyer was shot. The band flew to Los Angeles for the shoot, from Las Vegas where they had been staying for a while. Connolly later said that the band were not fans of shooting videos. He felt the band could not act, even if they tried and was personally relieved that he was not needed to act in the video.

Track listings

 UK CD single
 "You're All I Have" (live from Koko)
 "Run" (live from Koko)

 UK maxi-CD single
 "You're All I Have"
 "The Only Noise"
 "Perfect Little Secret"
 "You're All I Have" (video)

 UK 7-inch single
A. "You're All I Have"
B. "You're All I Have" (Minotaur Shock remix)

 European CD single
 "You're All I Have"
 "The Only Noise"

Charts and certifications

Weekly charts

Year-end charts

Certifications

Release history

References

External links
 

2006 singles
2006 songs
A&M Records singles
Fiction Records singles
Polydor Records singles
Snow Patrol songs
Song recordings produced by Jacknife Lee
Songs written by Gary Lightbody
Songs written by Jonny Quinn
Songs written by Nathan Connolly
Songs written by Paul Wilson (musician)
Songs written by Tom Simpson (musician)